Robert John Rose (February 28, 1930 – March 2, 2022) was an American prelate of the Roman Catholic Church. Rose served as bishop of the Diocese of Gaylord in Michigan from 1981 to 1989 and as bishop of the Diocese of Grand Rapids in Michigan from 1989 to 2003.

Biography

Early life 
Robert Rose was born in Grand Rapids, Michigan, on February 28, 1930, to Urban Henry and Maida Ann (née Glerum) Rose. Rose attended St. Francis Xavier School in Grand Rapids and in 1944 entered St. Joseph's Seminary in the same city. In 1950, Rose completed his final two years of college at the Grand Seminary of Montreal. In 1952, Rose entered the Pontifical Urban College in Rome, where he earned a Licentiate of Sacred Theology in 1956.

Priesthood 
On December 21, 1955, Rose was ordained to the priesthood for the Diocese of Grand Rapids at the Pontifical Urban College by Cardinal Clemente Micara.Following his return to Grand Rapids, Rose became a professor at St. Joseph's Seminary in August 1956. Working there for 13 years, he taught religion, Latin, Greek, French and music (chant). Rose earned a Master of Arts degree from the University of Michigan in 1962.

In July 1966, Rose became dean of the college department at St. Joseph's Seminary, and served as director of the deacon program from 1969 to 1971. In June 1971, he was appointed rector of St. John's Provincial Seminary in Plymouth, Michigan. In August 1977, Rose was named pastor of Sacred Heart Parish in Muskegon Heights, Michigan.

Bishop of Gaylord 
On October 13, 1981, Pope John Paul II appointed Rose as the second bishop of the Diocese of Gaylord. He was installed and consecrated on December 6, 1981, by Archbishop Edmund Szoka, with Bishops Joseph M. Breitenbeck and Joseph McKinney serving as co-consecrators, at St. Mary's Cathedral in Gaylord. Rose chose as his episcopal motto the Biblical phrase "in the Name of the Lord!",.

Bishop of Grand Rapids 
On June 24, 1989, John Paul II appointed Rose as the ninth bishop of the Diocese of Grand Rapids.  He was installed on August 30, 1989. Rose created lay leadership programs, revamped the Hispanic ministry and presented forums and events focused on racism in the diocese. He established the Catholic Foundation of West Michigan among other institutions.

In 2002, the Diocese of Grand Rapids acknowledged that it had paid a $500,000 settlement in 1994 to three women who were sexually abused as minors by John Thomas Sullivan, a diocesan priest, during the late 1950's.  The women did not report the crimes to the diocese until 1993.  Records showed that Bishop Allen Babcock, a previous bishop, had accepted Sullivan into the diocese even though Sullivan had previously fathered a child in the Diocese of Manchester in New Hampshire. Rose said that it should have never happened.

Personal life 
On October 13, 2003, John Paul II accepted Rose's retirement as bishop of the Diocese of Grand Rapids.  He moved to St. Camillus Woods, a residence for retired priests, in Byron Township, Michigan.Robert Rose died on March 2, 2022, at the age of 92.

See also
 

 Catholic Church hierarchy
 Catholic Church in the United States
 Historical list of the Catholic bishops of the United States
 List of Catholic bishops of the United States
 Lists of patriarchs, archbishops, and bishops

References

External links
Roman Catholic Diocese of Grand Rapids Official Site

Episcopal succession

1930 births
2022 deaths
University of Michigan alumni
20th-century Roman Catholic bishops in the United States
Roman Catholic bishops of Gaylord
Roman Catholic bishops of Grand Rapids
21st-century Roman Catholic bishops in the United States
Grand Séminaire de Montréal alumni
Pontificio Collegio Urbano de Propaganda Fide alumni